Vale is an unincorporated community in Avery County, North Carolina, United States.  It is located northwest of Newland on Old Toe River Road.

History
From 1904 to 1940, Vale was a flag stop along the East Tennessee and Western North Carolina Railroad; between Minneapolis and Newland. Old Toe River Road now resides on what was the old railway path.

See also
 East Tennessee and Western North Carolina Railroad
 North Toe River

References

Unincorporated communities in North Carolina
Unincorporated communities in Avery County, North Carolina